Derek Pike is an American filmmaker living in Los Angeles and known as a music video director. He is of half British and half Japanese-American descent. 
He has directed nearly 100 music videos working with artists including RedOne, Aloe Blacc, Wiz Khalifa, Moneybagg Yo, and XXXTentacion. He has also directed commercials for Macy's, and Monster Headphones.

At the age of 8, Derek had a drawing published in Sports Illustrated Kids. In high school, he attended Carrabassett Valley Academy and was a nationally ranked snowboarder. Some of his sponsors included Arbor Snowboards, 686 outerwear, Smith Optics, Adidas, Giro, and Swix.

Derek graduated from NYU's Tisch School of the Arts where he majored in Film and Television, and as a freshman walked on to the NYU soccer team.  At age 21, he became one of the youngest directors to have a music video featured on MTV.

In 2015, he sold an original screenplay titled A Choreographed Romance. In 2020, he wrote and directed the feature film "Model House" starring five models making their feature debuts alongside Scout Taylor Compton, and Chris Zylka.

References
INDEPENDENT FEATURE FILM “MODEL HOUSE” WRAPS FILMING IN OKLAHOMA - www.okfilmmusic.org - 10/20/20
Wiz Khalifa & Moneybagg Yo Head to College for New "Never Lie" Visual - www.hypebeast.com - 10/29/19
Wiz Khalifa and Moneybagg Yo Join Forces for “Never Lie” - www.complex.com - 10/28/19
Wiz Khalifa & Moneybagg Yo Are Frat Leaders At Taylor U In "Never Lie" Video - www.hotnewhiphop.com - 10/28/19
Watch PnB Rock’s New Video for “Middle Child” f/ XXXTentacion - www.complex.com - 8/8/19
Young Versions of XXXTENTACION and PNB Rock star in "Middle Child" - www.hotnewhiphop.com - 8/8/19
New Ruth B song 'Rare' out now, and you don't want to miss it - www.meaww.com - 9/21/18
De jolis mannequins qui rappent sur des sons de Tupac, Kanye West et Jay-Z - www.gqmagazine.fr - 3/11/17
WATCH THESE HOT MODELS RAP ALONG WITH ICE CUBE, JAY Z, TUPAC, KANYE, MIGOS AND MORE - maxim.com - 3/10/17
RedOne 'Don't You Need Somebody' by Derek Pike - promonews.com - 8/8/16
MTV News : D'Prince drops "Take Banana" video - mtvbase.com - 10/31/12
Diddy's son Quincy launches music career with "Stay Awhile" - drjays.com - 4/3/2012
VIBE Exclusive: Quincy music video debut directed by Derek Pike - vibe.com - 4/2/2012
Imelda May Roadrunner by Derek Pike - promonews.com - 8/17/11
DJ Drama Calls Oh My a Limitless Drug - mtv.com - 5/30/11
Y'all Respect the One that Got Shot - decaturdan.com - 4/14/11
Video Static: "Greatest Story Never Told" - videostatic.com - 1/17/11
Shooting Classics - qthequestion.com - 11/12/10
Interview: Derek Pike - juiceonline.com - 08/23/10
Derek Pike Interview - blog.nicholaspatten.com - 06/17/10
MC Saigon and Video Director Derek Pike - timeoutny.com - 04/28/10
Derek Pike: The Right Direction - amalgamdigital.com - 09/25/09
The Volume: On set with The Kid Daytona feat. Bun B directed by Derek Pike - timeoutny.com - 09/11/09
NYU senior Derek Pike directs new The Kid Daytona Video - nyulocal.com - 09/11/09

External links

Living people
1988 births
Tisch School of the Arts alumni
American people of British descent
American people of Japanese descent
American filmmakers